Shawn Doyle (born September 19, 1968) is a Canadian actor known for his roles in The Expanse, The Eleventh Hour, Big Love, 24, Desperate Housewives, and Star Trek: Discovery.

Early life and education
Doyle was born and raised in Wabush (Labrador), Newfoundland. He was exposed to acting at a young age, as his father was the founder of a local theatre group. Later, he moved to Toronto to study theatre at York University.

Career
He has won three awards for his critically acclaimed performance as Dennis Langley in The Eleventh Hour. Since moving to Los Angeles, he has also starred in the American shows 24 as Ronnie Lobell, Desperate Housewives as Mr. Hartley, and Big Love. He has also made several film appearances: as Jack Shepard in Frequency, Brian in 1998's Babyface, Stephen in the 2005 film Sabah, and as Ray in Grown Up Movie Star (which he co-produced). Other roles include John in the film adaptation of The Robber Bride and a lawyer in Lost. He had a recurring turn as Joey Henrickson, a former NFL player and brother of Bill Henrickson, the main character in the HBO series Big Love. He had a brief role on the short-lived but acclaimed FX series Terriers. He starred as agoraphobic chess genius Arkady Balagan in the Showcase original series Endgame. In the fall of 2011, he starred as the future first Canadian prime minister Sir John A. Macdonald in the CBC TV movie John A.: Birth of a Country. His performance won him a 2013 Canadian Screen Award for Best Performance by a Lead Actor in a television film or miniseries.

In 2012, he appeared in an episode of King. He has appeared in three episodes of Republic of Doyle as Carl Maher. He appeared in the Canadian film The Disappeared in the fall of 2012. He played in an episode of CBS's Vegas as FBI agent Patrick Byrne in 2013. In 2013, he began the recurring role of Isaac Taft on the Canada-based Syfy series Lost Girl. 2014 saw Doyle portray Aleksandre Belenko on Covert Affairs. He portrays Will Graham's defense attorney Leonard Brower on NBC's Hannibal, appeared as Chief of Police Vern Thurman on Fargo, and portrays Jackie Sharp's boyfriend (then later husband), Alan Cooke on House of Cards. In 2015, he appeared in a recurring role on This Life as high school principal, Andrew Wallace, and Sadavir Errinwright on the Syfy series The Expanse.

Filmography

Film

Television

Awards

References

External links

1968 births
Canadian male film actors
Canadian male television actors
Living people
Male actors from Newfoundland and Labrador
Canadian male stage actors
Dora Mavor Moore Award winners
Film producers from Newfoundland and Labrador